The  is a limited express service operated by Kyushu Railway Company (JR Kyushu) in Japan since March 2011. It operates between Kagoshima-Chūō Station and Ibusuki Station via the Ibusuki Makurazaki Line.

Service pattern
There are three return services per day. All trains stop at Kiire.

Rolling stock
The train was originally formed of two specially modified KiHa 47 diesel multiple unit cars, KiHa 47-8060 and KiHa 47-9079 (formerly KiHa 47-1079), based at Kagoshima Depot. The two cars were converted at JR Kyushu's Kokura Works. A third car, KiHa 140-2066, formerly used in the Hayato no Kaze DMU set, was rebuilt in 2012 to Ibusuki no Tamatebako style, entering service from 24 March 2012.

Exterior
The train is painted black on the landward side, and white on the seaward side, with gold lining and lettering.

Interior

The interior design of the train was overseen by industrial designer Eiji Mitooka. The train features totally new interiors with extensive use of wood for flooring, wall panels, and seating. Some seats are arranged facing the windows on the seaward side of the train.

History
The Ibusuki no Tamatebako service was introduced on 12 March 2011, coinciding with the full opening of the Kyushu Shinkansen.

A third car, KiHa 140-2066, was modified and added to formations at weekends and busy seasons from 24 March 2012.

See also
 Joyful Train

References

External links

 JR Kyushu Ibusuki no Tamatebako train information 

Named passenger trains of Japan
Railway services introduced in 2011
2011 establishments in Japan
Kyushu Railway Company